Sergei Valeryevich Mikhailov (born 23 September 1983) is a Russian former professional footballer.

Club career
He made his debut in the Russian Premier League in 2001 for FC Rotor Volgograd.

References

1983 births
Sportspeople from Volgograd
Living people
Russian footballers
FC Rotor Volgograd players
FC Metallurg Lipetsk players
FC Oryol players
Russian Premier League players
FC Vityaz Podolsk players
Association football midfielders
FC Avangard Kursk players
FC Sever Murmansk players
FC Nosta Novotroitsk players